Mazza may refer to:

 Mazza (surname), Italian surname
 Mazza Gallerie, upscale shopping mall in the Friendship Heights neighborhood of northwest Washington, D.C. 
 Mazza Museum, art museum located at The University of Findlay in Findlay, Ohio
 Mazza Point, snow-covered headland lying between Brahms Inlet and Mendelssohn Inlet, on Alexander Island, Antarctica
 Salvador Mazza, Salta, also known as "Pocitos", a town in northern Argentina
 Mazzatello (abbreviated mazza), a method of capital punishment
 Baron Carlo Mazza, a 1948 comedy film

See also 

 Mazzo (disambiguation)
 Mazzi